Many ships have borne the name Louisa, including:

Four ships of the Royal Navy have been named , as have several hired armed vessels that served the Royal Navy under contract:
HM 
HM 
  was launched in France in 1794, probably under another name. She was taken in prize and between 1798 and 1804 she made five complete voyages as a slave ship in the triangular trade in enslaved people. She was lost on the coast of Africa on her sixth voyage.
 , an American privateer, participated in the Quasi-War with France in 1800. 
 Louisa, a Swedish ship captured by the Spanish in 1800 while sailing from Lisbon to Barcelona. See List of ships captured in the 18th century#1800.
 Louisa (1823), of 242 tons (bm (old measurement)) or 306 tons (bm (new measurement)), was launched by J. Fowler at Howrah or Sulkea, Calcutta in 1823. In 1849 and 1853, she visited Adelaide.
 Louisa (1824) was a 141 nrt brig built in Guernsey.  She sailed from Hobart, Tasmania for Melbourne, Victoria on 16 December 1882 and was last seen the following day off Bicheno, in bad weather.

Citations

References
 

Ship names